The PFF Women's Cup is the national women's football cup of the Philippines organized by the Philippine Football Federation.

History
The inaugural edition was launched in 2014 by the Philippine Football Federation (PFF) and was contested by 10 teams from June to July 2014. The cup was played in a 9-a-side format with two halves of 25 minutes.

The following teams participated at the inaugural 9-a-side edition with their division in the group stage:

The following edition in 2015 was played in full 90 minutes with 11 field players on each team. 10 teams participated in the match mostly composed by University varsity and alumni teams. In 2016, the PFF Women's League was launched although the PFF would stop organizing the cup tournament.

The PFF revived the PFF Women's Cup in late 2022, following two years of inactivity of the women's league due to the COVID-19 pandemic. The competition had eight teams.

Winners

References

Philippines
Football cup competitions in the Philippines
Women's football in the Philippines
Recurring sporting events established in 2014
2014 establishments in the Philippines